Marjorie Alexandra Cooper (May 28, 1902 – September 12, 1984) was an educator, civil servant, and political figure in Saskatchewan. She represented Regina City from 1952 to 1964 and Regina West from 1964 to 1967 in the Legislative Assembly of Saskatchewan as a Co-operative Commonwealth Federation (CCF) member. She was the third woman elected to the Saskatchewan assembly and the longest sitting female member of the assembly.

Born Marjorie Alexandra Lovering, she was the daughter of Henry Langston Lovering and Annie Jane Boselly, both natives of Ontario, in Winnipeg, Manitoba and moved to Regina, Saskatchewan in 1907.

Cooper taught school in McCord from 1919 to 1925, when she married Ed Cooper. She was president of the Regina YWCA from 1941 to 1943 and president of the Regina Council of Women from 1946 to 1948. In 1945, she was named to the Saskatchewan Labour Relations Board and, in 1951, to the Saskatchewan Public Service Commission. After the death of her first husband, she married Wilfred Hunt in 1967. She died in Regina at the age of 82.

References 

Saskatchewan Co-operative Commonwealth Federation MLAs
20th-century Canadian legislators
1902 births
1984 deaths
Women MLAs in Saskatchewan
20th-century Canadian women politicians